FAD-dependent urate hydroxylase (HpxO enzyme, FAD-dependent urate oxidase, urate hydroxylase) is an enzyme with systematic name urate,NADH:oxygen oxidoreductase (5-hydroxyisourate forming). 
 A non-homologous isofunctional enzyme (NISE) to HpxO was found, and named HpyO. HpyO was determined to be a typical Michaelian enzyme. These FAD-dependent urate hydroxylases are flavoproteins.

This enzyme catalyses the following chemical reaction

 urate + FADH + H+ + O2  5-hydroxyisourate + FAD+ + H2O

References

External links 
 

EC 1.14.13